S. W. Budlong was a member of the Wisconsin State Senate. Budlong represented the 23rd District during the 1865 and 1866 sessions. He was a Democrat.

References

Democratic Party Wisconsin state senators
Year of birth missing
Year of death missing